Wallace Reis da Silva, known simply as Wallace (born 26 December 1987), is a Brazilian professional footballer who plays as a centre-back for Brusque, on loan from Vitória.

Career

Career statistics
(Correct )

FIFA Club World Cup

Honours
Vitória
Campeonato Baiano: 2008, 2009, 2010

Corinthians
Campeonato Brasileiro Série A: 2011
Copa Libertadores: 2012
FIFA Club World Cup: 2012

Flamengo
Copa do Brasil: 2013
Campeonato Carioca: 2014

References

External links
 ogol
 Wallace Reis at Soccerway

1987 births
Living people
Brazilian footballers
Esporte Clube Vitória players
Sport Club Corinthians Paulista players
CR Flamengo footballers
Grêmio Foot-Ball Porto Alegrense players
Gaziantepspor footballers
Göztepe S.K. footballers
Campeonato Brasileiro Série A players
Süper Lig players
Brazilian expatriate footballers
Expatriate footballers in Turkey
Brazilian expatriate sportspeople in Turkey
Association football central defenders